Timbellus rubidus is a species of sea snail, a marine gastropod mollusk in the family Muricidae, the murex snails or rock snails.

Description
The length of the shell attains 13.2 mm.

Distribution
This marine species is found off New Caledonia.

References

 Houart, R. (2001). Ingensia gen. nov. and eleven new species of Muricidae (Gastropoda) from New Caledonia, Vanuatu, and Wallis and Futuna Islands. in: P. Bouchet & B.A. Marshall (eds) Tropical Deep-Sea Benthos, volume 22. Mémoires du Muséum National d'Histoire Naturelle, ser. A, Zoologie. 185: 243–269
 Merle D., Garrigues B. & Pointier J.-P. (2011) Fossil and Recent Muricidae of the world. Part Muricinae. Hackenheim: Conchbooks. 648 pp. page(s): 133

Muricidae
Gastropods described in 2001